William Samuel Carlson (November 18, 1905 – May 8, 1994) was a 20th-century academic administrator who served as president of four universities.

Carlson was born in Ironwood, Michigan and earned bachelor's (1930), master's (1932) and Ph.D. (1938) degrees from the University of Michigan.  Carlson participated in the University of Michigan Greenland Expedition of 1928–1929 and led the fourth University of Michigan Greenland Expedition in 1930–1931.  After completing his education, he joined the University of Minnesota as an assistant professor of education, eventually becoming a full professor and dean of admissions and records.

He served in the Air Force during the Second World War, building air bases in Canada, Greenland, and Iceland for transport to Britain.

After the war, he assumed the presidencies of the University of Delaware, the University of Vermont, and the State University of New York in rapid succession.
  He undertook his longest Presidency at the University of Toledo, from which he retired after 14 years.

Carlson succumbed to lung cancer in Belleair Bluffs, Florida.  The main library on the University of Toledo campus is named after him.

Selected works

References

External links
 Northern Lights Manuscript at Dartmouth College Library

1905 births
1994 deaths
People from Ironwood, Michigan
Chancellors of the State University of New York
Presidents of the University of Delaware
University of Michigan alumni
University of Minnesota faculty
Presidents of the University of Toledo
Presidents of the University of Vermont
United States Army Air Forces personnel of World War II
20th-century American academics